Clark Stuart Keltie (born 31 August 1983) is an English professional footballer who plays as a midfielder for Sorrento FC.

He has notably played in the Football League for Darlington, Rochdale and Lincoln City, and in the Icelandic Premier League for Þór Akureyri and 1. deild karla for Víkingur Ólafsvík. He has also been contracted to League of Ireland side Cork City and has appeared back at non-League level for Chester City, Gateshead and Darlington 1883.

Career
Keltie started his career as a youngster with Walker Central before joining Sunderland on a trial period. After two games he was offered a one-year deal with the Premier League side but decided on giving his services to Darlington on a three-year contract in September 2001. Keltie made his debut at the age of 18 in the final game of the 2001–02 season at Oxford City.
 
The following season Keltie went from strength to strength, becoming the youngest captain in the club's history, in the absence of regular captain Craig Liddle. A cruciate knee ligament injury sustained in training in late January 2005 saw Keltie sidelined for six months. He spent eight years with Darlington until he was released by manager Dave Penney in May 2008 due to financial reasons within the hierarchy. Having made a total of 181 appearances for the Quakers, scoring 11 goals.

He moved to fellow League Two club Rochdale. Ending the season in the League Two semi-final play-offs, losing out to Gillingham in the second leg. In his second season with Rochdale, Keltie was loaned to Chester City and Gateshead. He had his contracted with Rochdale terminated by mutual consent on 24 December 2009. He trained with former club Darlington and had agreed to re-join them in January 2010 on a six-month deal, but instead moved to Lincoln City.

Initially, Keltie's contract at Lincoln City was until the end of the season. However, he impressed sufficiently to be offered another year. Playing a key role in the club's survival in League Two.

Keltie signed with Icelandic side Þór Akureyri on 21 July 2011 after leaving Lincoln City, on a deal lasting through the end of the Icelandic season. The club reached the Icelandic national cup final only to finish runner-up to champions KR Reykjavik.

Keltie signed with League of Ireland Premier Division side Cork City in January 2012. After trialling with the club during the summer of 2011, Keltie said on his arrival that he was grateful that Tommy Dunne had given him a second opportunity to sign for the club. The player and club mutually agreed to terminate his contract for personal reasons on 22 January, and Keltie then returned to Darlington on a non-contract basis.

Keltie moved to Iceland again in May 2012 for a short period of time, this time to Víkingur Ólafsvík. The team went on to finish second place, gaining promotion to the Premier League for part of the season.

He returned to England, joining Darlington 1883, but was released by the club after a short period in December 2012.

Personal life
In November 2011, he faced criminal prosecution after crashing his car into a telephone box in Newcastle. Keltie was also found to have a string of past motor related offences, a spokeswomen for Northumbria Police mentioned "Clark Keltie, 28, of Denton Burn, Newcastle, has been charged with careless driving, failing to stop after an accident and failing to report an accident. He is due to appear before magistrates later this month."

References

External links

1983 births
Living people
Footballers from Newcastle upon Tyne
English footballers
Association football midfielders
Darlington F.C. players
Rochdale A.F.C. players
Chester City F.C. players
Gateshead F.C. players
Lincoln City F.C. players
Þór Akureyri players
Cork City F.C. players
English Football League players
National League (English football) players
Northern Football League players
Expatriate footballers in Iceland
Ungmennafélagið Víkingur players
National Premier Leagues players
English expatriate footballers
Expatriate soccer players in Australia
Perth SC players